Grevillea umbellulata is a shrub which is endemic to the south-west of Western Australia.

Description
It produces white, cream, pink or grey flowers between July and December (mid winter to early summer) in its native range.

Taxonomy
The species was first formally described by botanist Carl Meissner, his description published in  Plantae Preissianae in 1848.

Distribution
The shrub is found from around the Shire of Irwin in the north down as far as Albany in the south and as far as Ravensthorpe in the east. It is found in a variety of habitats including plains, slopes, swamps, river banks and railway verges growing in sandy, clay or gravel soils around or over granite, limestone or laterite.

See also
 List of Grevillea species

References

umbellulata
Endemic flora of Western Australia
Eudicots of Western Australia
Proteales of Australia
Taxa named by Carl Meissner
Plants described in 1848